Americana may refer to:

Americana (music), a genre or style of American music 
Americana (culture), artifacts of the culture of the United States

Film, radio and television
Americana (1981 film), an American drama film
Americana (2023 film), an upcoming American crime thriller film
Americana (radio series), a series on BBC Radio 4, reporting current affairs from the US
Americana (1992 TV series), a documentary series presented by Jonathan Ross
Americana, a 2012 American drama series written by Michael Seitzman
Americana (game show), a quiz show that aired on NBC from 1947 to 1949

Literature
Americana (book), a 2004 non-fiction book by Hampton Sides
Americana (novel), a 1971 novel by Don DeLillo
Americanah, a 2013 novel by Chimamanda Ngozi Adichie
Encyclopedia Americana

Music

Albums
Americana, a 1999 album by jazz trumpeter Arturo Sandoval
Americana (Diesel album), 2016
Americana (Michael Martin Murphey album)
Americana (Neil Young & Crazy Horse album), 2012
Americana (Roch Voisine album), a 2008 album by Canadian singer Roch Voisine
Americana (Starflyer 59 album), 1997
Americana (The Offspring album), 1998, and also a song from that album
Americana II a 2009 album by Roch Voisine
Americana III, a 2010 album by Roch Voisine
Americana (Ray Davies album), 2017
Americana (Leon Russell album), 1978

Other
"Americana" (song), 1988 single by Moe Bandy
Americana (revue), a 1926 Broadway revue written by J. P. McEvoy
Americana, a female professional wrestler from the Gorgeous Ladies of Wrestling
Americana (The Offspring video), a 1998 video album

Places

Brazil
Americana, São Paulo, a city in Brazil

United States
Americana Amusement Park, a former name of the defunct LeSourdesville Lake Amusement Park in Monroe, Ohio
Americana at Brand, an outdoor mall in Glendale, California
Americana Hotel, a former name of the Sheraton New York Times Square Hotel in New York City, New York
Americana Manhasset, a shopping center in Manhasset, New York

Other
Americana de Aviacion, a former Peruvian airline
Americana Futebol, a football club based in Americana, São Paulo, Brazil
Americana series, a series of US definitive postage stamps issued between 1975 and 1981
Armlock#Top shoulder lock, an armlock in grappling also known as "americana"
Americana Group, a multinational food company and franchise operator based in Kuwait
 Americana, a fictional TV network on which Daphne Blake's series Coast To Coast with Daphne Blake aired in the movie Scooby Doo on Zombie Island

See also
Americain (disambiguation)
American (disambiguation)
Americano (disambiguation)
Americanum
Americanus (disambiguation)